The 30th Launch Group was a  United States Air Force unit, and was assigned to the 30th Space Wing, Vandenberg AFB, California.

Overview
The 30th Launch Group was responsible for booster and satellite technical oversight and launch processing activities to include launch, integration and test operations. The group consisted of an integrated military, civilian and contractor team with more than 250 personnel directly supporting operations from the Western Range.

Lineage
 Established as 30th Launch Group on 28 Oct 2003
 Activated on 1 Dec 2003
 Inactivated on 20 July 2018

Assignments
 30th Space Wing, 1 Dec 2003–20 Jul 2018

Units
 2d Space Launch Squadron, 1 Dec 2003-31 Oct 2005
 4th Space Launch Squadron, 1 Dec 2003–Present
 1st Air and Space Test Squadron, 1 Dec 2003–Present

Missiles
 Titan II, 2003
 Atlas II, 2003
 Titan IV, 2003-2005
 Delta II, 2003-2009
 Minotaur, 2003–Present
 Pegasus, 2003–Present
 Atlas V, 2003–Present
 Delta IV, 2003–Present

References

 30th Launch Group Factsheet

Space groups of the United States Air Force
Space access